Scorpio maurus is a species of North African and Middle Eastern scorpion, also known as the large-clawed scorpion or Israeli gold scorpion and lesser known as Zerachia scorpion.

This is a small/medium-sized scorpion  from the family Scorpionidae. It has brown back and golden claws. There are many sub-species of this scorpion, 19 of which were described by Fet et al.

The venom of Scorpio maurus contains a high variety of toxins including proteases, phospholipases, protease inhibitors and potassium channel toxins δ-KTx. Although its venom contains a weak neurotoxin called maurotoxin, S. maurus is not a dangerous scorpion for humans. There are no records of fatalities.

Habits
Found in very deep burrows in deserts and occasionally sparse woodland. Its habit of creating very deep burrows (up to 1 metre deep) means that in captivity this scorpion is often happiest with higher humidity: sand that is deep will be moist, thereby creating a comparatively humid burrow.

References

External links

Information on Scorpio maurus from The Scorpion Files

Scorpionidae
Animals described in 1758
Invertebrates of North Africa
Taxa named by Carl Linnaeus